Kandelaki is a Georgian surname of early medieval Caucasus Greek Byzantine origin which may refer to:
Ilia Kandelaki, Georgian footballer
Georgi Kandelaki, Georgian boxer
Tina Kandelaki, Russian journalist of Georgian origin
Alexander Kandelaki, American Financial Advisor of Georgian origin

Surnames of Georgian origin
Georgian-language surnames
Georgian people of Greek descent
Greek families